Henry Hite (May 1, 1915 – May 26, 1978) born Henry Marion Mullens, was an American actor, stage performer, media personality and spokesperson who was well known for making personal appearances promoting the Corn King brand (Wilson Certified Meats trade-name)  as the "Corn King Giant",  and for the occasional movie that would capitalize on his height.  Although promoted as "the world's tallest man" at 8 ft 2 in, his actual height was 7 ft 6¾ in (2.31 m).

At age 18, he changed his name  to 'Hite' and partnered with 'Lowe' (Roland Picaro), to form a Vaudeville act, later as "Lowe, Hite and Stanley" which included the midget Stanley Ross. Hite's stage career ended in 1962 following the death of Ross.

Filmography

See also
 Gigantism

References

Further reading
 — 1938 case study: "H. M. M." [Henry M. Mullens]

External links

1915 births
1978 deaths
American male film actors
People with gigantism
20th-century American male actors
Vaudeville performers
People with acromegaly